The 2014 German Masters was a professional ranking snooker tournament that took place between 29 January–2 February 2014 at the Tempodrom in Berlin, Germany. It was the seventh ranking event of the 2013/2014 season.

Two maximum breaks were compiled during the qualifying stage of the tournament at the Barnsley Metrodome in Barnsley, England. Dechawat Poomjaeng made the 101st official maximum break during his match against Zak Surety. This was Poomjaeng's first 147 break. Just one day later Gary Wilson made the 102nd official maximum break during the match against Ricky Walden. This was Wilson's first 147 break.  It also took the total number of maximum breaks for the season to five.

Ali Carter was the defending champion, but he lost 4–5 against Dechawat Poomjaeng in the last 64.

Ding Junhui won his 10th ranking title by defeating Judd Trump 9–5 in the final. Ding became the first player to win four ranking events in a single season since Stephen Hendry in 1990/1991.

Prize fund
The total prize money of the event was raised to €337,100 from the previous year's €300,000. The breakdown of prize money for this year is shown below:

Winner: €80,000
Runner-up: €35,000
Semi-final: €20,000
Quarter-final: €10,000
Last 16: €5,000
Last 32: €3,000
Last 64: €1,500

Non-televised highest break: €0
Televised highest break: €4,000
Non-televised maximum break: €2,976
Total: €337,976

Main draw

Top half

Bottom half

Final

Qualifying
These matches were played on 11 and 12 December 2013 at the Barnsley Metrodome in Barnsley, England. All matches were best of 9 frames.

Century breaks

Qualifying stage centuries

 147, 135  Gary Wilson
 147  Dechawat Poomjaeng
 141  Alan McManus
 122  Xiao Guodong
 120  Dominic Dale
 118  Matthew Stevens
 115  Noppon Saengkham
 115  Mark Selby
 113  Peter Ebdon
 111  Michael Holt
 111  Neil Robertson
 110  Judd Trump
 109  Joe Perry
 107  Barry Hawkins
 107  Mark King
 106  Anthony McGill
 105  Dave Harold
 103  Robin Hull
 102  Ross Muir
 101  Sam Baird
 100  Michael White
 100  Marco Fu

Televised stage centuries

 143, 106  Michael Holt
 138, 130, 114  Xiao Guodong
 128  Shaun Murphy
 127, 122, 117, 110, 102  Judd Trump
 125, 121, 107, 101  Ding Junhui
 124, 108  Tian Pengfei
 124  Neil Robertson
 123  Gary Wilson
 118  Mark King
 113, 105  Mark Selby
 112  Anthony McGill
 109  Ryan Day
 104, 102  Joe Perry
 104  Joel Walker
 102  Kurt Maflin
 100  Mark Williams
 100  Stephen Maguire

References

External links

 2014 German Masters – Pictures by World Snooker at Facebook

2014
German Masters
Masters
Sports competitions in Berlin